UCI Road World Championships – Women's junior road race is the annual world championship race for road bicycle racing for women in the Junior category. It is organised by the world governing body, the Union Cycliste Internationale. It was first held in 1987. In 2020 no junior race was held due to the COVID-19 pandemic.

The winner of the event is entitled to wear the rainbow jersey in Junior competitions for one year.

Medal winners

Source

Medallists by nation

References

 

Women's road race
junior women's road race
 
Lists of UCI Road World Championships medalists